Jamie Barton is an American politician. A Republican, he is a member of the Pennsylvania House of Representatives from the 124th district since 2023.

References

External links

Living people
21st-century American politicians
Republican Party members of the Pennsylvania House of Representatives
Alvernia University alumni
Year of birth missing (living people)